Septian Satria Bagaskara (born 26 September 1997) is an Indonesian professional footballer who plays as a striker for Liga 1 club RANS Nusantara.

Club career

Persik Kediri 
Born in Kediri, Bagaskara started his professional career with Persedikab Kediri in 2016, In 2017 Bagaskara joined Persik Kediri. On 25 November 2019 Persik successfully won the 2019 Liga 2 Final and promoted to Liga 1, after defeated Persita Tangerang 3–2 at the Kapten I Wayan Dipta Stadium, Gianyar.

Persekat Tegal (loan)
He was signed for Persekat Tegal to play in Liga 3 Regional route: Central Java in the 2018 season, on loan from Persik Kediri.

RANS Nusantara
Bagaskara was signed for RANS Nusantara to play in Liga 1 in the 2022–23 season. He made his league debut on 23 July 2022 in a match against PSIS Semarang at the Jatidiri Stadium, Semarang. On 29 July 2022, Bagaskara scored his first league goals for the team with scored two goals in a 3–3 draw over PSS Sleman at the Pakansari Stadium. On 9 December 2022, Bagaskara scored in the 44th minute and saved RANS Nusantara from losing to Persikabo 1973. score draw 1–1. A week laters, he scored in a 2–1 win over Bhayangkara.

International career 
He made his international debut for Indonesia U23 on June 7, 2019 against Thailand U23 at 2019 Merlion Cup.

Honours

Club 
Persik Kediri
 Liga 3: 2018
 Liga 2: 2019

Individual
 Liga 3 Top Goalscorer: 2018 (21 goals)

References

External links
 Septian Bagaskara at Soccerway
 Septian Bagaskara at Liga Indonesia

1997 births
Living people
Indonesian footballers
Liga 2 (Indonesia) players
Liga 1 (Indonesia) players
Persik Kediri players
RANS Nusantara F.C. players
Association football forwards
People from Kediri (city)
Sportspeople from East Java
Indonesia youth international footballers